The GEN 125 is a Japanese aircraft engine, designed and produced by the GEN Corporation for use in ultralight helicopters.

Design and development
The engine is a twin cylinder two-stroke, horizontally-opposed, air-cooled, direct-drive, gasoline engine design. It employs capacitor discharge ignition and produces  at 8500 rpm. The engine weighs .

The engine was designed specifically for the GEN H-4 helicopter, in which four of the engines are mounted to provide redundancy.

Variants
GEN 125
Base model producing 
GEN 125-F
Model producing

Applications
GEN H-4

Specifications (GEN 125)

See also

References

External links

Video of the GEN 125 engines in flight in the GEN H-4

Two-stroke aircraft piston engines
Air-cooled aircraft piston engines
2010s aircraft piston engines